Spencer Martin is an Australian championship-winning racing driver. Martin's short career was highlighted by two Australian Drivers' Championship victories in 1966 and 1967, racing for Bob Jane Racing.

Racing career
After spectating at the Mount Druitt circuit in the late 1950s Martin entered his first motor race in 1960 in a self-built car at Gnoo Blas circuit. A mechanic by trade, Martin moved through the ranks through his contacts in the trade, racing a PRAD sports car and a successful Holden touring car.

Martin's break came when he defeated Norm Beechey in a touring car race. Beechey's entrant, David McKay offered Martin a drive with McKay's Scuderia Veloce team at the 1963 Armstrong 500 co-driving with Brian Muir. He achieved a class victory in the 1964 Armstrong 500, sharing a Vauxhall Viva with Bill Brown.

Martin became a part of Scuderia Veloce as a mechanic and driver, acting as lead mechanic when the team brought in international drivers for the Tasman Series. He raced the team's Repco Brabham BT11A as well as a Ferrari 250LM sports car, winning the 1965 Six Hour Le Mans with McKay in the Ferrari. Martin also placed third in the Italian car in the Australian Tourist Trophy in both 1965 and 1966. He left the team in mid-1966 after a top-ten championship finish in the 1966 Tasman Series and found employment with Bob Jane's team. Martin drove Jane's Brabham BT11 to victory in the 1966 and 1967 Australian Drivers' Championships. Martin retired at his peak after the 1967 season to begin a family, although he returned sporadically for Touring Car endurance races including the 1969 Datsun Three Hour, in which he drove for the Holden Dealer Team.

In 1979 Martin returned to Scuderia Veloce, racing a Volvo 242 GT touring car at the Bathurst 1000. This led to historic sports car racing overseas, becoming a fixture in the 1980s and 1990s in Europe and North America. Martin made a return to Bathurst in 1993, co-driving with his son Matthew in a Bob Holden-entered Toyota Corolla in the Tooheys 1000. Martin continues to race historics.

Results

References

Living people
1940 births
Tasman Series drivers
Racing drivers from Sydney